Chu Hwa-il (born 30 April 1932) is a South Korean former sports shooter. He competed at the 1956 Summer Olympics, the 1964 Summer Olympics and five editions of Asian Games from 1958 to 1974.

References

1932 births
Living people
South Korean male sport shooters
Olympic shooters of South Korea
Shooters at the 1956 Summer Olympics
Shooters at the 1964 Summer Olympics
Place of birth missing (living people)
Asian Games medalists in shooting
Shooters at the 1958 Asian Games
Shooters at the 1962 Asian Games
Shooters at the 1966 Asian Games
Shooters at the 1970 Asian Games
Shooters at the 1974 Asian Games
South Korean military personnel
Sportspeople from South Jeolla Province
Asian Games gold medalists for South Korea
Asian Games silver medalists for South Korea
Medalists at the 1966 Asian Games
20th-century South Korean people
21st-century South Korean people